The 2014–15 Boston Celtics season was the 69th season of the franchise in the National Basketball Association (NBA)., The Boston Celtics finished the regular season with a 40–42 won-loss record, which was the 2nd best in the Atlantic division.

The Celtics made several transactions during the season. Rajon Rondo was traded to the Dallas Mavericks on December 18, 2014, Austin Rivers was acquired from the New Orleans Pelicans on January 12, but three days later, he was again traded to the Los Angeles Clippers after refusing to suit up for the Celtics, and in February, Isaiah Thomas was acquired from the Phoenix Suns.

On March 9, 2015, the Celtics passed the previous season's win total of 25 with a 100–90 win over the Miami Heat.

On April 13, 2015, the Celtics qualified for the playoffs for the 7th time in the last 8 seasons and for the first time since 2012–13.  Their season ended after being swept in the first round playoff series by the Cleveland Cavaliers.

Preseason

Draft

Regular season

Standings

Game log

Preseason game log

|- style="background:#cfc;"
| 1 
| October 6
| Philadelphia
| 
| Evan Turner (25)
| Jared Sullinger (16)
| Evan Turner (10)
| TD Garden14,143
| 1–0
|- style="background:#cfc;"
| 2 
| October 8
| New York
| 
| Jared Sullinger (33)
| Jared Sullinger (7)
| Marcus Smart (12)
| XL Center8,462
| 2–0
|- style="background:#cfc;"
| 3 
| October 10
| @ Toronto
| 
| Avery Bradley (25)
| Jared Sullinger (9)
| Jared Sullinger (17)
| Air Canada Centre16,729
| 2–1
|- style="background:#fbb;"
| 4 
| October 11
| New York
| 
| Marcus Smart (25)
| Jared Sullinger (9)
| Evan Turner (13)
| Mohegan Sun Arena9,252
| 3–1
|- style="background:#cfc;"
| 5 
| October 15
| Toronto
| 
| Marcus Thornton (27)
| Jared Sullinger (15)
| Evan Turner (18)
| Cumberland County Civic Center5,909
| 4–1
|- style="background:#cfc;"
| 6 
| October 16
| @ Philadelphia
| 
| Jared Sullinger (41)
| Jared Sullinger (12)
| Rajon Rondo (10)
| Wells Fargo Center8,201
| 5–1
|- style="background:#cfc;"
| 7 
| October 19
| @ Brooklyn
| 
| Jared Sullinger (24)
| Jared Sullinger (20)
| Marcus Smart (14)
| Barclays Center13,787
| 6–1
|- style="background:#cfc;"
| 8 
| October 22
| Brooklyn
| 
| Marcus Smart (27)
| Jared Sullinger (27)
| Phil Pressey (15)
| TD Garden15,508
| 7–1

Regular season game log

|- bgcolor="ccffcc"
| 1
| October 29
| Brooklyn
| 
| Kelly Olynyk (19)
| Rondo & Turner (7)
| Rajon Rondo (12)
| TD Garden18,624
| 1–0

|- bgcolor="ffcccc"
| 2
| November 1
| @ Houston
| 
| Jeff Green (17)
| Rajon Rondo (8)
| Rajon Rondo (10)
| Toyota Center18,309
| 1–1
|- bgcolor="ffcccc"
| 3
| November 3
| @ Dallas
| 
| Jeff Green (35)
| Rajon Rondo (9)
| Rajon Rondo (15)
| American Airlines Center19,948
| 1–2
|- bgcolor="ffcccc"
| 4
| November 5
| Toronto
| 
| Jeff Green (20)
| Jared Sullinger (16)
| Rajon Rondo (15)
| TD Garden16,249
| 1–3
|- bgcolor="ccffcc"
| 5
| November 7
| Indiana
| 
| Jared Sullinger (17)
| Jeff Green (7)
| Rajon Rondo (6)
| TD Garden17,122
| 2–3
|- bgcolor="ccffcc"
| 6
| November 8
| @ Chicago
|  
| Evan Turner (19)
| Kelly Olynyk (11)
| Evan Turner (6)
| United Center22,104
| 3–3
|- bgcolor="ffcccc"
| 7
| November 12
| Oklahoma City
| 
| Rajon Rondo (20)
| Jared Sullinger (11)
| Rajon Rondo (12)
| TD Garden17,043
| 3–4
|- bgcolor="ffcccc"
| 8
| November 14
| Cleveland
| 
| Kelly Olynyk (21)
| Jared Sullinger (10)
| Rajon Rondo (16)
| TD Garden18,624
| 3–5
|- bgcolor="ffcccc"
| 9
| November 17
| Phoenix
| 
| Jeff Green (28)
| Rajon Rondo (10)
| Rajon Rondo (9)
| TD Garden16,726
| 3–6
|- bgcolor="ccffcc"
| 10
| November 19
| @ Philadelphia
| 
| Brandon Bass (23)
| Jeff Green (10)
| Rajon Rondo (13)
| Wells Fargo Center12,701
| 4–6
|- bgcolor="ffcccc"
| 11
| November 21
| @ Memphis
| 
| Kelly Olynyk (18)
| Olynyk, Green, Sullinger & Turner (6)
| Evan Turner (5)
| FedExForum17,712
| 4–7
|- bgcolor="ffcccc"
| 12
| November 23
| Portland
| 
| Green, Sullinger (19)
| Kelly Olynyk (6)
| Rajon Rondo (8)
| TD Garden16,692
| 4–8
|- bgcolor="ffcccc"
| 13
| November 28
| Chicago
| 
| Jared Sullinger (23)
| Jared Sullinger (10)
| Rajon Rondo (9)
| TD Garden18,203
| 4–9
|- bgcolor="ffcccc"
| 14
| November 30
| San Antonio
| 
| Jeff Green (16)
| Tyler Zeller (10)
| Rajon Rondo (10)
| TD Garden17,121
| 4–10

|- bgcolor="ffcccc"
| 15
| December 2
| @ Atlanta
| 
| Jeff Green (25)
| Rajon Rondo (12)
| Rajon Rondo (19)
| Philips Arena12,705
| 4–11
|- bgcolor="ccffcc"
| 16
| December 3
| Detroit
| 
| Jeff Green (32)
| Tyler Zeller (10)
| Rajon Rondo (8) 
| TD Garden15,870
| 5–11
|- bgcolor="ccffcc"
| 17
| December 5
| L.A. Lakers
| 
| Tyler Zeller (24)
| Tyler Zeller (14)
| Rajon Rondo (16)
| TD Garden18,624
| 6–11
|-bgcolor="ccffcc"
| 18
| December 7
| Washington
| 
| Jeff Green (25)
| Rajon Rondo (13)
| Rajon Rondo (11)
| TD Garden16,716
| 7–11
|-bgcolor="ffcccc"
| 19
| December 8
| @ Washington
| 
| Jeff Green (28)
| Kelly Olynyk (11)
| Evan Turner (8)
| Verizon Center14,828
| 7–12
|-bgcolor="ffcccc"
| 20
| December 10
| @ Charlotte
| 
| Green, Thornton (16)
| Rajon Rondo (10)
| Rajon Rondo (10)
| Time Warner Cable Arena15,276
| 7–13
|- bgcolor="ffcccc"
| 21
| December 12
| New York
| 
| Jeff Green (28)
| Rajon Rondo (7)
| Rajon Rondo (10)
| TD Garden17,989
| 7–14
|- bgcolor="ccffcc"
| 22
| December 15
| @ Philadelphia
| 
| Kelly Olynyk (30)
| Jared Sullinger (11)
| Rajon Rondo (7)
| Wells Fargo Center12,903
| 8–14
|-bgcolor="ccffcc"
| 23
| December 17
| Orlando
| 
| Brandon Bass (18)
| Zeller, Rondo (7)
| Rajon Rondo (15)
| TD Garden16,764
| 9–14
|-bgcolor="ccffcc"
| 24
| December 19
| Minnesota
| 
| Kelly Olynyk (21)
| Jared Sullinger (10)
| Avery Bradley (7)
| TD Garden17,042
| 10–14
|- bgcolor="ffcccc"
| 25
| December 21
| @ Miami
| 
| Tyler Zeller (22)
| Tyler Zeller (8)
| Olynyk, Bradley, & Smart (4)
| American Airlines Arena19,720
| 10–15
|- bgcolor="ffcccc"
| 26
| December 23
| @ Orlando
| 
| Tyler Zeller (22)
| Tyler Zeller (10)
| Jameer Nelson (11)
| Amway Center17,489
| 10–16
|- bgcolor="ffcccc"
| 27
| December 26
| Brooklyn
| 
| Jeff Green (22)
| Tyler Zeller (9)
| Marcus Smart (6)
| TD Garden18,624
| 10–17
|- bgcolor="ffcccc"
| 28
| December 27
| @ Washington
| 
| Jeff Green (23)
| Kelly Olynyk (8)
| Evan Turner (4)
| Verizon Center20,356
| 10–18
|- bgcolor="ccffcc"
| 29
| December 31
| Sacramento
|  
| Jared Sullinger (20)
| Jared Sullinger (11)
| Evan Turner (11)
| TD Garden18,624
| 11–18

|- bgcolor="ffcccc"
| 30
| January 2
| Dallas
| 
| Avery Bradley (22)
| Tyler Zeller (10)
| Marcus Smart (7)
| TD Garden18,624
| 11–19
|- bgcolor="ffcccc"
| 31
| January 3
| @ Chicago
| 
| Evan Turner (29)
| Jared Sullinger (16)
| Evan Turner (6)
| United Center21,820
| 11–20
|- bgcolor="ffcccc"
| 32
| January 5
| Charlotte
| 
| Jared Sullinger (22)
| Jared Sullinger (8)
| Turner, Bass, & Smart (4)
| TD Garden16,720
| 11–21
|- bgcolor="ccffcc"
| 33
| January 7
| @ Brooklyn
| 
| Avery Bradley (21)
| Evan Turner (7)
| Evan Turner (8)
| Barclays Center16,005
| 12–21
|- bgcolor="ffcccc"
| 34
| January 9
| @ Indiana
| 
| Avery Bradley (23)
| Evan Turner (15)
| Evan Turner (7)
| Bankers Life Fieldhouse18,165
| 12–22
|- bgcolor="ffcccc"
| 35
| January 10
| @ Toronto
| 
| Kelly Olynyk (23)
| Jared Sullinger (10)
| Evan Turner (5)
| Air Canada Centre19,800
| 12–23
|-bgcolor="ccffcc"
| 36
| January 12
| New Orleans
| 
| Jared Sullinger (27)
| Jared Sullinger (10)
| Marcus Smart (6)
| TD Garden16,905
| 13–23
|- bgcolor="ffcccc"
| 37
| January 14
| Atlanta
| 
| Avery Bradley (17)
| Jared Sullinger (9)
| Evan Turner (6)
| TD Garden16,067
| 13–24
|- bgcolor="ffcccc"
| 38
| January 16
| Chicago
| 
| Jared Sullinger (20)
| Kelly Olynyk (9)
| Evan Turner (8)
| TD Garden18,624
| 13–25
|- bgcolor="ffcccc"
| 39
| January 19
| @ L.A. Clippers
| 
| Brandon Bass (17)
| Evan Turner (10)
| Marcus Smart (7)
| Staples Center19,060
| 13–26
|- bgcolor="ccffcc"
| 40
| January 22
| @ Portland
| 
| Avery Bradley (18)
| Brandon Bass (10)
| Evan Turner (8)
| Moda Center19,567
| 14–26
|- bgcolor="ccffcc"
| 41
| January 23
| @ Denver
| 
| Avery Bradley (18)
| Brandon Bass (9)
| Evan Turner (6) 
| Pepsi Center16,133
| 15–26
|- bgcolor="ffcccc"
| 42
| January 25
| @ Golden State
| 
| Jared Sullinger (25)
| Sullinger, Bass (9)
| Evan Turner (7)
| Oracle Arena19,596
| 15–27
|- bgcolor="ccffcc"
| 43
| January 26
| @ Utah
| 
| Tayshaun Prince (19)
| Jared Sullinger (9)
| Prince, Smart (5)
| EnergySolutions Arena18,947
| 16–27
|- bgcolor="ffcccc"
| 44
| January 28
| @ Minnesota
| 
| Jared Sullinger (16)
| Tyler Zeller (9)
| Turner, Smart (6)
| Target Center11,434
| 16–28
|- bgcolor="ffcccc"
| 45
| January 30
| Houston
| 
| Bass, Thornton (17)
| Tyler Zeller (11)
| Sullinger, Smart (4)
| TD Garden17,675
| 16–29

|- bgcolor="ffcccc"
| 46
| February 1
| Miami
| 
| Bradley, Zeller (17)
| Bass, Zeller (6)
| Marcus Smart (9)
| TD Garden17,366
| 16–30
|- bgcolor="ccffcc"
| 47
| February 3
| @ New York
| 
| Avery Bradley (26)
| Jared Sullinger (9)
| Jared Sullinger (6)
| Madison Square Garden17,366 
| 17–30
|- bgcolor="ccffcc"
| 48
| February 4
| Denver
| 
| Bradley, Thornton (17)
| Marcus Smart (10)
| Turner, Smart (8)
| TD Garden15,126
| 18–30
|- bgcolor="ccffcc"
| 49
| February 6
| Philadelphia
| 
| Jared Sullinger (22)
| Tyler Zeller (9)
| Marcus Smart (8)
| TD Garden18,322
| 19–30
|- bgcolor="ffcccc"
| 50
| February 7
| @ Milwaukee
| 
| Jared Sullinger (17)
| Jared Sullinger (7)
| Evan Turner (7)
| BMO Harris Bradley Center16,470
| 19–31
|- bgcolor="ccffcc"
| 51
| February 11
| Atlanta
| 
| Jared Sullinger (17)
| Jared Sullinger (15)
| Evan Turner (9)
| TD Garden16,083
| 20–31
|- align="center"
| colspan="9" style="background:#bbcaff;" | All-Star Break
|- bgcolor="ffcccc"
| 52
| February 20
| @ Sacramento
| 
| Avery Bradley (28)
| Brandon Bass (10)
| Evan Turner (9)
| Sleep Train Arena17,317
| 20–32
|- bgcolor="ffcccc"
| 53
| February 22
| @ L.A. Lakers
| 
| Avery Bradley (20)
| Tyler Zeller (11)
| Evan Turner (12)
| Staples Center18,997
| 20–33
|- bgcolor="ccffcc"
| 54
| February 23
| @ Phoenix
| 
| Avery Bradley (20)
| Evan Turner (12)
| Isaiah Thomas (7)
| US Airways Center17,076
| 21–33
|- bgcolor="ccffcc"
| 55
| February 25
| New York
| 
| Jonas Jerebko (20)
| Evan Turner (12)
| Evan Turner (10)
| TD Garden16,899 
| 22–33
|- bgcolor="ccffcc"
| 56
| February 27
| Charlotte
| 
| Isaiah Thomas (28)
| Jonas Jerebko (10)
| Thomas, Turner (7)
| TD Garden18,624
| 23–33

|- bgcolor="ffcccc"
| 57
| March 1
| Golden State
| 
| Isaiah Thomas (20)
| Jae Crowder (17)
| Evan Turner (6)
| TD Garden18,624 
| 23–34
|- bgcolor="ffcccc"
| 58
| March 3
| @ Cleveland
| 
| Brandon Bass (15)
| 5 players (5)
| Evan Turner (7)
| Quicken Loans Arena20,562
| 23–35
|- bgcolor="ccffcc"
| 59
| March 4
| Utah
| 
| Isaiah Thomas (21)
| Tyler Zeller (11)
| Isaiah Thomas (7)
| TD Garden16,354 
| 24–35
|- bgcolor="ccffcc"
| 60
| March 6
| @ New Orleans
| 
| Isaiah Thomas (27)
| Jae Crowder (9)
| Evan Turner (6) 
| Smoothie King Center17,274
| 25–35
|- bgcolor="ffcccc"
| 61
| March 8
| @ Orlando
| 
| Isaiah Thomas (21)
| Brandon Bass (17)
| Isaiah Thomas (9)
| Amway Center17,041
| 25–36
|- bgcolor="ccffcc"
| 62
| March 9
| @ Miami
| 
| Isaiah Thomas (25)
| Brandon Bass (9)
| Thomas, Bass (4)
| American Airlines Arena19,600
| 26–36
|- bgcolor="ccffcc"
| 63
| March 11
| Memphis
| 
| Avery Bradley (17)
| Tyler Zeller (9)
| Evan Turner (7)
| TD Garden17,135 
| 27–36
|- bgcolor="ccffcc"
| 64
| March 13
| Orlando
| 
| Evan Turner (30)
| Brandon Bass (7)
| Phil Pressey (10)
| TD Garden18,624
| 28–36
|- bgcolor="ccffcc"
| 65
| March 14
| @ Indiana
| 
| Tyler Zeller (18)
| Evan Turner (7)
| Turner, Smart, Zeller, Crowder (7)
| Bankers Life Fieldhouse 18,165
| 29–36
|- bgcolor="ccffcc"
| 66
| March 16
| Philadelphia
| 
| Tyler Zeller (26)
| Avery Bradley (10)
| Avery Bradley (6)
| TD Garden16,553 
| 30–36
|- bgcolor="ffcccc"
| 67
| March 18
| @ Oklahoma City
|  
| Marcus Smart (25)
| Smart, Crowder (9) 
| Evan Turner (10)
| Chesapeake Energy Arena18,203
| 30–37
|- bgcolor="ffcccc"
| 68
| March 20
| @ San Antonio
| 
| Evan Turner (17)
| Jonas Jerebko (12)
| Smart, Turner (4) 
| AT&T Center18,581
| 30–38
|- bgcolor="ffcccc"
| 69
| March 22
| Detroit
| 
| Evan Turner (22)
| Bass, Jerebko, Olynyk (9)
| Evan Turner (8)
| TD Garden18,624
| 30–39
|- bgcolor="ccffcc"
| 70
| March 23
| @ Brooklyn
| 
| Avery Bradley (20)
| Evan Turner (10)
| Evan Turner (12)
| Barclays Center16,814
| 31–39
|-bgcolor="ffcccc"
| 71
| March 25
| Miami
| 
| Jae Crowder (16)
| Tyler Zeller (8)
| Phil Pressey (6)
| TD Garden18,624
| 31–40
|- bgcolor="ccffcc"
| 72
| March 27
| @ New York
| 
| Isaiah Thomas (18)
| Brandon Bass (10)
| Isaiah Thomas (6)
| Madison Square Garden19,812
| 32–40
|-bgcolor="ffcccc"
| 73
| March 29
| L.A. Clippers
| 
| Isaiah Thomas (19)
| Jonas Jerebko (8)
| Evan Turner (10)
| TD Garden18,624
| 32–41
|- bgcolor="ccffcc"
| 74
| March 30
| @ Charlotte
| 
| Avery Bradley (30)
| Avery Bradley (8)
| Isaiah Thomas (7)
| Time Warner Cable Arena15,140
| 33–41

|- bgcolor="ccffcc"
| 75
| April 1
| Indiana
| 
| Olynyk & Zeller (19)
| Evan Turner (11)
| Evan Turner (12)
| TD Garden18,624
| 34–41
|- bgcolor="ffcccc"
| 76
| April 3
| Milwaukee
| 
| Isaiah Thomas (23)
| Tyler Zeller (7)
| Thomas & Turner (6)
| TD Garden18,624
| 34–42
|- bgcolor="ccffcc"
| 77
| April 4
| @ Toronto
| 
| Isaiah Thomas (25)
| Tyler Zeller (9)
| Evan Turner (10)
| Air Canada Centre19,800
| 35–42
|- bgcolor="ccffcc"
| 78
| April 8
| @ Detroit
| 
| Isaiah Thomas (34)
| Tyler Zeller (6)
| Isaiah Thomas (6)
| The Palace of Auburn Hills14,284
| 36–42
|- bgcolor="ccffcc"
| 79
| April 10
| @ Cleveland
| 
| Marcus Smart (19)
| Jared Sullinger (8)
| Evan Turner (13)
| Quicken Loans Arena20,562
| 37–42
|- bgcolor="ccffcc"
| 80
| April 12
| Cleveland
| 
| Isaiah Thomas (17)
| Crowder & Olynyk & Turner (7)
| Isaiah Thomas (6)
| TD Garden18,624
| 38–42
|- bgcolor="ccffcc"
| 81
| April 14
| Toronto
| 
| Turner, Bradley (14) 
| Brandon Bass (9)
| Evan Turner (9)
| TD Garden18,624
| 39–42 
|- bgcolor="ccffcc"
| 82
| April 15
| @ Milwaukee
| 
| Luigi Datome (22)
| Jonas Jerebko (6)
| Phil Pressey (7)
| BMO Harris Bradley Center17,316
| 40–42

Playoffs

Game log

|- bgcolor = "ffbbbb"
| 1
| April 19
| @ Cleveland
| 
| Isaiah Thomas (22)
| Evan Turner (7)
| Isaiah Thomas (10)
| Quicken Loans Arena20,562
| 0–1
|- bgcolor = "ffbbbb"
| 2
| April 21
| @ Cleveland
| 
| Isaiah Thomas (22)
| Evan Turner (12)
| Isaiah Thomas (7)
| Quicken Loans Arena20,562
| 0–2
|- bgcolor = "ffbbbb"
| 3
| April 23
| Cleveland
| 
| Evan Turner (19)
| Turner, Sullinger (8)
| Evan Turner (8)
| TD Garden18,624
| 0–3
|- bgcolor = "ffbbbb"
| 4
| April 26
| Cleveland
| 
| Thomas, Sullinger (21)
| Jared Sullinger (11)
| Isaiah Thomas (9)
| TD Garden18,624
| 0–4

Player statistics

Summer League

|-
| 
| 4
| 0
| 13.5
| .857
| .000
| .333
| 4.8
| 0.0
| 1.0
| 0.5
| 3.5
|-
| 
| 5
| 2
| 20.0
| .346
| .188
| .800
| 2.0
| 1.6
| 0.4
| 0.0
| 5.0
|-
| 
| 3
| 0
| 12.3
| .667
| .429
| .250
| 1.7
| 1.0
| 0.0
| 0.0
| 6.7
|-
| 
| 0
| 0
| 0.0
| .000
| .000
| .000
| 0.0
| 0.0
| 0.0
| 0.0
| 0.0
|-
| 
| 5
| 3
| 15.8
| .650
| .000
| .667
| 2.4
| 0.4
| 0.2
| 0.6
| 6.4
|-
| 
| 4
| 0
| 12.0
| .333
| .250
| 1.000
| 1.3
| 1.0
| 0.3
| 0.0
| 6.8
|-
| 
| 5
| 5
| 23.8
| .306
| .188
| .727
| 4.2
| 1.0
| 0.4
| 0.6
| 6.6
|-
| 
| 5
| 3
| 26.2
| .451
| .423
| .733
| 4.8
| 2.0
| 2.0
| 1.0
| 13.6
|-
| 
| 4
| 0
| 4.5
| .000
| .000
| .000
| 1.8
| 0.0
| 1.0
| 0.0
| 0.0
|-
| 
| 4
| 4
| 32.5
| .400
| .278
| .765
| 7.3
| 2.0
| 2.0
| 0.0
| 17.5
|-
| 
| 5
| 3
| 27.4
| .322
| .200
| .733
| 3.8
| 5.4
| 2.2
| 0.0
| 10.6
|-
| 
| 5
| 5
| 29.2
| .294
| .257
| .833
| 4.2
| 4.2
| 2.0
| 0.4
| 14.8
|-
| 
| 0
| 0
| 0.0
| .000
| .000
| .000
| 0.0
| 0.0
| 0.0
| 0.0
| 0.0
|}

Source: NBA.com

Preseason

|}

Regular season

|}

Injuries

Roster

Transactions

Trades

Free agents

Re-signed

Additions

Subtractions

References

External links

 2014–15 Boston Celtics preseason at ESPN
 2014–15 Boston Celtics regular season at ESPN

Boston Celtics
Boston Celtics seasons
Boston Celtics
Boston Celtics
Celtics
Celtics